Britta Schwarz (born 1964) is a German contralto from Neubrandenburg, Mecklenburg-Vorpommern. Between 1980 and 1983 she studied vocals at the Hochschule für Musik "Hanns Eisler" under Christa Niko, and then studied at the Hochschule für Musik Carl Maria von Weber with Christian Elßner and Hartmut Zabel.
She has performed with notable orchestras such as the Dresden Staatskapelle, Dresdner Philharmonie, Berliner Philharmoniker, Concertgebouw Orchestra Amsterdam and Academy of St Martin-in-the-Fields, and conductors such as Kent Nagano, Marek Janowski, Milan Horvat, Michel Plasson, Jörg-Peter Weigle and Philippe Herreweghe. Her singing is mainly centred on Baroque music, and is an interpreter of J. S. Bach. She has sung with ensembles such as the Akademie für Alte Musik Berlin, Freiburger Barockorchester, Musica Antiqua Köln, and Cantus Cölln.

References

External links
Official site

1964 births
Living people
German contraltos
People from Neubrandenburg